The NHK Cup (Go), or as it is more commonly known the , is a professional Go tournament (Go competition) organized by the Japan Go Association (Nihon Ki-in) and sponsored by the Japan Broadcasting Corporation (NHK). The tournament lasts roughly one year from April to the following March. Post-game analysis involving the two players and the two commentators takes place once the game has ended (broadcast time permitting). This year (2019) marks the 67th time the tournament has been held and the host is Shiho Hoshiai 2P. Prior to 1963, the tournament was broadcast on the radio.

Tournament Format
A fixed number of spots in the main tournament are reserved for "seeded players" (higher ranked players, existing title holders, those with superior win loss records, etc.) while the remaining spots are decided through a series of preliminary tournaments. Once the final 50 players have been determined, they are divided into two blocks (Block A and Block B) of 25 players each.

The tournament consists of 6 rounds: the first 5 rounds determine the winner of each block、and then the two block winners meet in Round 6 for the tournament championship. The reigning title holder and runner-up as well as a select number of other players are awarded first round byes, thus actually only needing to win 5 games in order to win the tournament. The basic time control for each game is 30 seconds per move. In addition, each player has 10 periods of extra thinking time, 1 minute each.

The winner of the tournament receives 5,000,000 Yen (approximately US$48,000 ) in prize money, in addition to the NHK Cup.

Past winners
The final games of each Cup fall into the following year. 
So the first NHK Cup, for example, was officially held in 1953, but decided in 1954.

Lifetime Champions 
To date, only one player has won the tournament enough times to be awarded this title: Sakata Eio who won the tournament a total of 11 times.

References 

Go competitions in Japan
Go Time